Shocker may refer to:

Shocker (comics), a supervillain in the Marvel Comics shared universe of comic book series
In the :
Jackson Brice / Shocker
Herman Schultz / Shocker
Shocker (wrestler), a Mexican-American professional wrestler
Shocker (hand gesture), a hand gesture with a sexual connotation
The Shocker (band), a musical group led by Jennifer Finch
Wichita State Shockers, the nickname of Wichita State University athletic teams, a contraction of the original term "Wheatshockers"
Shocker (paintball marker), a paintball marker built by Smart Parts
Shocker (film), a 1989 Wes Craven horror film
Shocker (Kamen Rider), a fictional organization from Kamen Rider
The Shocker (album), a 1996 hip hop album by American rapper Silkk the Shocker
Shocker (Dungeons & Dragons), creature in the Dungeons & Dragons series
Shock site

See also
 Shock (disambiguation)